The 1968 Five Nations Championship was the thirty-ninth series of the rugby union Five Nations Championship. Including the previous incarnations as the Home Nations and Five Nations, this was the seventy-fourth series of the northern hemisphere rugby union championship. Ten matches were played between 13 January and 23 March. It was contested by England, France, Ireland, Scotland and Wales. It marked the first Grand Slam victory for France.

Participants
The teams involved were:

Table

Squads

Results

References

External links

The official RBS Six Nations Site

Six Nations Championship seasons
Five Nations
Five Nations
Five Nations
Five Nations
Five Nations
Five Nations
 
Five Nations
Five Nations
Five Nations